Kelvin Davis (born July 12, 1959) is an American former professional basketball player. He became the oldest rookie to play in the American Basketball Association, when he debuted at age 47 during the 2006–07 season for the Atlanta Vision.

Early life 
Davis was born in New Brunswick, New Jersey on July 12, 1959 to parents Matthew and Verba Davis. In 1961, his family moved to Evergreen, Alabama where he played football, basketball and baseball, and ran track. In basketball, Kelvin averaged 21 points per game. Kelvin made the all state Team and was the most valuable player in Conecuh County, Alabama.

After graduating from high school Davis was offered a basketball scholarship to Jefferson Davis Jr. College in Brewton, Alabama. Two years later he was offered a scholarship to Alabama State University (ASU). In 1982 he graduated from ASU with a degree in Physical Education with a minor in Biology.

Professional career

Atlanta Vision (2006–2007) 
At the age of 47, Davis' dream was realized when he was recruited by the Atlanta Vision of the American Basketball Association by its coach Dennis Scott, formerly of the Orlando Magic. Davis became the oldest rookie in the history of the ABA. Davis' ultimate goal is play in the NBA.

In September 2021, Davis tried out for the Birmingham Squadron of the NBA G League.

Personal life 
In 1982, Davis became a member of Rice Temple Church where he met his wife Stephanie.  They have three children: born Danielle, Kelvin Jr. and Princeton Davis.

In 1991, Davis moved to Huntsville, Alabama where he Pastored the Victory Temple Church. He also started teaching in the Huntsville City Schools district. In 2004 Davis moved to Atlanta, Georgia, where he started a paint contracting business. He never lost the passion and love of basketball and his dream of becoming a professional basketball player.

References

1959 births
Living people
Alabama State Hornets basketball players
Basketball players from Alabama
American men's basketball players
People from Conecuh County, Alabama
Basketball players from New Jersey
Junior college men's basketball players in the United States
Sportspeople from New Brunswick, New Jersey